Robert Lido (September 21, 1914 – August 9, 2000) was an American musician and singer who was a regular member of television's The Lawrence Welk Show. His instrument was the violin.

Life and career
Born in Jersey City, New Jersey, he began playing the violin as a child and later took vocal lessons. His talents led him to stints as a featured performer with Carmen Cavallaro's band and later with Perry Como's supper club. He joined Welk in 1952 and until the maestro's retirement in 1982, Bob was their featured violinist, and an accomplished vocalist both with tender ballads, jazz favorites and also country music. He also was one of the show's comics as well, featured in many humorous novelty songs with fellow Welk stars such as Aladdin, Larry Hooper and Charlie Parlato.

He also led a revival of the Hotsy Totsy Boys, one of Lawrence's early bands, which were popular features on the show during the early 1970s. They featured Lido as lead vocalist and fiddler, Parlato on trumpet, Russ Klein on saxophone, Richard Maloof on tuba, Bob Havens on trombone, Neil Levang on ukulele and banjo, Bob Ralston on piano and Jack Imel playing the drums and spoons.

Death
Lido died in 2000 in San Diego, California from complications of a stroke.

References

1914 births
2000 deaths
Musicians from Jersey City, New Jersey
American people of Italian descent
American male violinists
20th-century American musicians
Lawrence Welk
20th-century American male musicians